The Regiment "Cavalleggeri di Monferrato" (13th) ( - "Chevau-légers of Monferrato") is an inactive cavalry unit of the Italian Army named for the Duchy of Montferrat.

History

Formation 
On 12 September 1848, between the two campaigns of the First Italian War of Independence, three squadrons of mounted guides were formed Stupinigi. On 3 January 1850 the Regiment "Cavalleggeri di Monferrato" was formed in Pinerolo, with the three mounted guides squadrons becoming the new regiment's first three squadrons. The regiment's 4th Squadron was formed with personnel from the Regiment "Savoia Cavalleria" and horses from the Regiment "Cavalleggeri di Saluzzo". The regiment's depot was formed with personnel from the Regiment "Genova Cavalleria".

The regiment's 1st Squadron was part of the Sardinian expeditionary corps' Provisional Light Cavalry Regiment, which fought in the Crimean War and distinguished itself on 16 August 1855 in the Battle of the Chernaya.

Italian Wars of Independence 
During the Second Italian War of Independence the regiment fought in the battles of Montebello and San Martino. For its conduct in the two battles the regiment was awarded a Bronze Medal of Military Valour.<ref name="Cavalleggeri (13°)">

In 1863-65 the regiment operated initially in the area of San Giorgio La Molara and San Marco dei Cavoti, and then in the area of Ripacandida to suppress the anti-Sardinian revolt in Southern Italy after the Kingdom of Sardinia had invaded and annexed the Kingdom of Two Sicilies.

In 1866 the regiment participated in the Third Italian War of Independence and fought in the Battle of Ponte di Versa. Over the next years the regiment repeatedly changed its name:

 10 September 1871: 13th Regiment of Cavalry (Monferrato)
 5 November 1876: Cavalry Regiment "Monferrato" (13th)
 16 December 1897: Regiment "Cavalleggeri di Monferrato" (13th)

In 1887 the regiment contributed to the formation of the Mounted Hunters Squadron, which fought in the Italo-Ethiopian War of 1887–1889. In 1895-96 the regiment provided one officer and 67 enlisted for units deployed to Italian Eritrea for the First Italo-Ethiopian War. In 1911-12 the regiment provided one officer and 80 enlisted to augment units fighting in the Italo-Turkish War. Between the Second Italian War of Independence and World War I the Monferrato ceded on six occasions one of its squadrons to help form new Chevau-légers regiments:

 16 September 1859: Regiment "Cavalleggeri di Montebello" (8th)
 16 February 1864: Regiment "Cavalleggeri di Caserta (17th)
 1 January 1872: Regiment "Cavalleggeri di Roma" (20th)
 1 October 1883: Regiment "Cavalleggeri di Padova" (21st)
 1 November 1887: Regiment "Cavalleggeri di Umberto I" (23rd)
 1 October 1909: Regiment "Cavalleggeri di Aquila" (27th)

World War I 
At the outbreak of World War I the regiment consisted of a command, the regimental depot, and two cavalry groups, with the I Group consisting of three squadrons and the II Group consisting of two squadrons and a machine gun section. Together with the Regiment "Cavalleggeri di Roma" (20th) the Monferrato formed the I Cavalry Brigade of the 1st Cavalry Division of "Friuli". The division fought dismounted in the trenches of the Italian Front. In 1916 the regiment was temporarily reinforced with the 2nd Squadron of the Regiment "Cavalleggeri di Piacenza" (18th). In October 1916 the regiment fought in the Battle of Monfalcone. In 1917 the regimental depot in Udine formed the 740th Dismounted Machine Gunners Company as reinforcement for infantry units on the front. After the disastrous defeat in the Battle of Caporetto in October 1917 the regiment fought a delaying action at Pasian Schiavonesco. After the Italian victory in the Battle of Vittorio Veneto, the regiment, like all cavalry regiments, was ordered to advance as fast as far as possible and so by 4 November 1918 the regiment reached in Cornino.

Interwar years 
After the war the Italian Army disbanded 14 of its 30 cavalry regiments and so on 21 November 1919 the II Group of the Monferrato was renamed "Cavalleggeri di Umberto I" as it consisted of personnel and horses from the disbanded Regiment "Cavalleggeri di Umberto I" (23rd). On 20 May 1920 the Monferrato received and integrated a squadron from the disbanded Regiment "Cavalleggeri di Lucca" (16th), which before had been one of the squadrons of the Regiment "Cavalleggeri di Padova" (21st). On the same date the Monferrato also received the traditions of the disbanded Regiment "Cavalleggeri di Umberto I" (23rd).

In 1933 the Monferrato moved from Udine to Voghera. In 1935 the regiment contributed the following personnel for the Second Italo-Ethiopian War:

 one officer and 309 enlisted for the formation of the III and IV truck-transported machine gunners groups of the Regiment "Lancieri di Aosta" (6th)
 seven officers and 413 enlisted for other units

World War II 
At the outbreak of World War II the regiment consisted of a command, a command squadron, the I and II squadrons groups, each with two mounted squadrons, and the 5th Machine Gunners Squadron. In 1940 the regiment participated in the invasion of France. Afterwards the regiment was sent to Albania, where it remained until the announcement of the Armistice of Cassibile on 8 September 1943. The regiment refused to surrender to invading German forces and fought against the Germans in the area of Berat. On 14 November 1943 the remnants of the regiment were overcome by German forces and the next day the Germans executed the regiment's commanding officer Colonel Luigi Lanzuolo for having refused to surrender in September.

During the war the regiment's depot in Voghera formed the:
 I Road Movement Battalion "Cavalleggeri di Monferrato"
 III Armored Group "Cavalleggeri di Monferrato" (armored cars)
 IV Armored Group "Cavalleggeri di Monferrato" (Ant-tank)
 LIX Dismounted Group "Cavalleggeri di Monferrato"

The III Armored Group "Cavalleggeri di Monferrato" was formed on 1 February 1942 and sent to North Africa, where the group participated in the Western Desert Campaign and the Tunisian Campaign. The group surrendered with the rest of the Axis forces in Tunisia on 13 May 1943. The IV Armored Group "Cavalleggeri di Monferrato" was sent to Albania, where the group fought with he regiment against the Germans until 14 November 1943.

References

Cavalry Regiments of Italy